Lost Melodies: A Collection of Rarities, Demos, and Remixes is a compilation album by the Canadian alternative rock band Jets Overhead. The album was released on June 26, 2007 and contains demo versions of a number of tracks from the group's first album, Bridges, remixes of two songs from the Jets Overhead EP, as well as two b-sides.

Track listing
 "No More Nothing (Demo)" – 3:07
 "Suicide Machines" – 3:41
 "Blue Is Red (Demo)" – 4:14
 "Bridges (Demo)" – 3:38
 "Shadow Knows (Demo)" – 5:29
 "Shooting Star" – 2:57
 "Addiction (Warne Livesey remix)" – 4:42
 "Sun Sun Sun (Warne Livesey remix)" - 3:55

External links
 Jets Overhead official website

Jets Overhead albums
2006 compilation albums